Randrianasolo's sportive lemur (Lepilemur randrianasoloi), or the Bemaraha sportive lemur, is a sportive lemur endemic to Madagascar. Randrianasolo's sportive lemur is found in western Madagascar.

Originally named L. randriansoli, the name was found to be incorrectly formed and was corrected to L. randrianasoloi in 2009. This species's original 2006 description was entirely online, and therefore did not meet the ICZN standards to be a valid name. It was given a formal described in 2017.

References

Sportive lemurs
Mammals described in 2017